Melita Vovk (14 June 1928 – 27 July 2020) was a Slovene painter and illustrator of children's books.

Melita Vovk was born in Bled in 1928. She has illustrated numerous children's books and won the Levstik Award twice, in 1957 for her illustrations for Zgode in nezgode kraljevskega dvora (Tales and Mishaps of the Royal Court) by Milan Šega and in 1965 for her illustrations for three books, Basni (Fables) by Ivan Krylov, Puhek v Benetkah (Puhek in Venice)  by Mira Mihelič  and Pustov god (Pust's Birthday) by Vera Albreht. She received the lifetime achievement award for illustration at the 9th Slovenian Biennial of Illustration in 2010.
 
Vovk's first husband was the literary critic and stage director Bojan Štih and she is sometimes referred to as Melita Vovk Štih. Their daughter Ejti Štih is also a painter who lives and works in Santa Cruz in Bolivia.

Selected Illustrated Works

 Ko zorijo jagodee (When Strawberries Ripen), written by Branka Jurca, 1976
 Uganke (Riddles), written by Oton Župančič, 1975
 Zverinice z Večne poti (Little Beasts from the Eternal Road), written by Polonca Kovač, 1975
 Avtomoto mravlje (Automotive Ants), written by Jože Snoj, 1975
 Veliki čarovnik Ujtata (The Great Wizard Ujtata), written by Vida Brest, 1974
 Juri-Muri v Afriki (Juri-Muri in Africa), written by Tone Pavček, 1973
 Popki (Belly Buttons), written by Breda Smolnikar, 1973 
 Nevsakdanje potovanje (An Unusual Trip), written by Ada Škerl, 1973 
 Gimnazijka (High School Girl), written by Anton Ingolič, 1973
 Moja prva knjiga (My First Book), written by Tone Seliškar, 1969
 Teden ima sedem dni, sedem dni ima teden (The Week Has Seven Days, Seven Days Does Have the Week), written by Smiljan Rozman, 1969
 Novo leto na strehi (New Year on the Roof), written by Mira Mihelič, 1966  
 Pustov god (Pust's Birthday), written by Vera Albreht, 1965
 Puhek v Benetkah (Puhek in Venice), written by Mira Mihelič, 1965
 Sračje sodišče ali je, kar je (The Crows's Court Or What Is Just Is), written by Matej Bor, 1961
 Žemlje (Bread Rolls), written by Ferdo Godina, 1961
 Skriti dnevnik (The Hidden Diary), written by Leopold Suhodolčan, 1961
 Nekoč pod Gorjanci (Once Under the Gorjanci), written by Vera Albreht, 1960
 Tacek (Tacek), written by Ela Peroci, 1959
 Zgode in nezgode kraljevskega dvora (Tales and Mishaps of the Royal Court), written by Milan Šega, 1957
 Ptice in grm (The Birds and the Bush), written by Vida Brest, 1955

References

1928 births
2020 deaths
Slovenian illustrators
Slovenian women illustrators
Slovenian children's book illustrators
Slovenian painters
People from Bled
Levstik Award laureates
University of Ljubljana alumni
Slovenian women artists